Selvær is an island and fishing village in the municipality of Træna in Nordland county, Norway. The 70 or so residents on the island make their living by fishing or fishing-related fields. Historically, there was also some farming done on the island. The only access to Selvær is by a public ferry from Husøya or by personal boats. There are about 55 residents on the island.

See also
List of islands of Norway

References

Islands of Nordland
Træna